In Greek mythology, Phalanthos (Ancient Greek: Φάλανθος) is a divine hero, the leader of the Spartan Partheniae and the founder of Taranto. He is said to have been condemned to death by the ephors.He was married to Aethra, who,while picking his lice, wept on his husband's head,because her husband's efforts coming to nothing after her husband fears an oracle tells the impossibility of his project to take control of the city.From this her husband realized the oracle(which was to hit the city when it rains, but as his wifes nane was Aethra which means bright sky,her tears would be equivalent of raining bright skies),which was fulfilled,helped him conquer Tarantum.

It is said that before Phalanthus reached Italy, he suffered a shipwreck in the Crisaean sea, and was brought ashore by a dolphin.

See also 

 Phalanthus

Sources

 Strabo, Geography (VI, 3, 2-3) =
 Antiochus of Syracuse (FGrH 555F13) ;
 Ephorus of Cumae (FGrH 70F216).

Bibliography 
  Jean Bérard, La colonisation grecque de l'Italie méridionale et de la Sicile dans l'Antiquité. L'histoire et la légende, Paris, 1957, pp.162-175.
  Marinella Corsano, « Sparte et Tarente : le mythe de fondation d'une colonie », in Revue de l'histoire des religions 196, 2, 1979, pp.113-140.
  G. Maddoli, "Falanto spartiata", in Mélange de l'École française de Rome 95, 1983, pp.555-564.
  Domenico Musti, Strabone e la Magna Grecia, Padoue, 1988, pp.151-172.
 Irad Malkin, Myth and Territory in the Spartan Mediterranean, Cambridge, 1994
  Claudia Antonetti, "Phalanthos “entre Corinthe et Sycione”", in Dialogues d'histoire ancienne 22/1, 1996, pp.65-78
 Giovanna Bonivento Pupino, Noi Tarantini Figli di Parteni, in Ribalta di Puglia nn.8-9 marzo 2003 https://www.academia.edu/11088541/Noi_Tarantini_figli_di_Parteni
 Jonathan M. Hall, A History of the Archaic Greek World, ca. 1200-479 BCE, Blackwell, 2007, p111-114

Laconian mythology
Ancient Tarantines
Greek mythological heroes

Characters in Greek mythology